Lampadia is a genus of air-breathing land snails, terrestrial pulmonate gastropod mollusks in the family Helicidae, the true snails.

Species
Species within the genus Lampadia include:
 Lampadia webbiana (Lowe, 1831)

References 

Gastropod genera
Helicidae
Taxonomy articles created by Polbot